John Gregory (also John Griggorie) (1612 – August 15, 1689), a cobbler and tanner, was a founding settler of Norwalk, Connecticut. He was a deputy of the General Court of the Connecticut Colony in the sessions of October 1659, October 1662, May 1663, May 1665, October 1667, May 1668, May and October 1669, October 1670, October 1671, May 1674, May 1675, October 1677, May 1679, October 1680, May 1681, October 1695.

Emigration and residence in New Haven 
He was born in Nottinghamshire, England in 1612, the son of Henry Gregory and Mary Goody. He emigrated with his father in the early 1630s. He is known to have lived in the New Haven Colony between 1639 and 1646. In 1644 he was admitted to the New Haven Court. His sons Joseph and Thomas were born in New Haven in 1646 and 1648, respectively.

Settlement of Norwalk 
Roger Ludlow purchased the land that would become Norwalk in 1640. Ludlow contracted with fourteen men for the original planting of Norwalk. In 1649, Richard Olmsted and Nathaniel Ely became the first two settlers. One of the fourteen was Richard Webb, whose wife was John Gregory's sister.

John Gregory lived in the East Norwalk section of Norwalk, along what is now East Avenue. He was an active member of the community, holding office almost continuously during his life in Norwalk.

He is listed on the Founders Stone bearing the names of the founding settlers of Norwalk in the East Norwalk Historical Cemetery.

Settlement of Newark 
When the New Haven Colony was absorbed into the Connecticut Colony in 1662, many of the Puritan settlers were displeased at the fact that the new colony's constitution didn't include certain restrictions on non-Puritan settlers. The New Haven colonists believed that only members of the Puritan church should be allowed to vote, and that only the children of church members could be baptized.

In response, the New Haven Puritans sent Robert Treat and John Gregory to meet with Philip Carteret, the new Royal Governor of New Jersey. The group chose the present day site of Newark for a new settlement. In May 1666, the Puritan settlers, led by Treat, purchased the land directly from the Hackensack Indians.

References 

1612 births
1689 deaths
American Puritans
Burials in East Norwalk Historical Cemetery
Deputies of the Connecticut General Assembly (1662–1698)
Deputies of the Connecticut General Court (1639–1662)
History of Newark, New Jersey
Politicians from New Haven, Connecticut
People from Nottinghamshire
Founding settlers of Norwalk, Connecticut
Shoemakers
Tanners